Oxycera dives, the round-spotted major, is a European species of soldier fly.

Description
Adult body length 5.5 to 6.5 mm. Wing length 6 mm. Adults have almost completely black legs and a scutellum with two spines.

Distribution
Austria, Czech Republic, England, Finland, France, Germany, Poland, Russia, Scotland, Slovakia, Switzerland.

References

Stratiomyidae
Diptera of Europe
Insects described in 1845